Ahti is a heroic character of Finnish Folk poetry.

Ahti may also refer to:
Ahti (Egyptian deity), a malevolent hippopotamus goddess
2826 Ahti, an asteroid, named after the Finnish myth character

People

Given name
Ahti Heinla (born 1972), Estonian programmer and entrepreneur
Ahti Karjalainen (1923–1990), Finnish politician 
Ahti Kõo (born 1952), Estonian politician
Ahti Pekkala (1924–2014), Finnish politician
Ahti Toivanen (born 1990), Finnish biathlete 
Ahti Vilppula (born 1959), Finnish businessman

Surname
Risto Ahti (born 1943), Finnish writer
Teuvo Ahti (born 1934), Finnish lichenologist

Estonian masculine given names
Finnish masculine given names